Theodoros "Thodoris" Tsiloulis  (born May 12, 1993) is a Greek professional basketball player for ASK Karditsa of the Greek A2 Basket League. He is a 1.92 m (6 ft 4 in) tall combo guard.

Professional career
Tsiloulis was born at Larissa and played amateur basketball with multiple teams of Larissa. He began his pro career with the Greek League club Peristeri, in the 2011–12 season. After one year, he joined Aries Trikala of the Greek A2 Basket League, With Trikala, he gained the promotion back to the Greek Basket League. He then moved to AEL 1964, before returning to Trikala after two years, in 2015. The next season, he re-joined AEL 1964, where he had a preety good season with the club. 

In 2017, he joined Holargos of the Greek A2 Basket League and he managed to gain the promotion with the club. On June 27, 2018, he joined Ermis Agias, which later was renamed as Larisa in order to compete to the Greek League.

References

External links
Proballers Profile
FIBA Europe Profile
Eurobasket.com Profile Profile
Greek Basket League Profile

1993 births
Living people
A.E.L. 1964 B.C. players
Aries Trikala B.C. players
Basketball players at the 2010 Summer Youth Olympics
Greek men's basketball players
Larisa B.C. players
Peristeri B.C. players
Point guards
Shooting guards
Basketball players from Larissa